Camille d'Ornano (4 April 1917 – 2 August 1987) was a French colonial administrator and diplomat. He served as High Commissioner of the French Territory of the Afars and Issas from 1976 to until its independence as Djibouti in 1977. He later served as French Ambassador in Luxembourg.

References

French colonial governors and administrators
1917 births
1987 deaths